This was the second of seven editions of the tournament in the 2021 tennis season. Luis David Martínez and David Vega Hernández were the defending champions but lost in the quarterfinals to Nathaniel Lammons and Jackson Withrow.

Hugo Nys and Tim Pütz won the title after defeating Lloyd Glasspool and Harri Heliövaara 7–6(7–4), 6–3 in the final.

Seeds

Draw

References

External links
 Main draw

Biella Challenger Indoor II - Doubles